Dýšina is a municipality and village in Plzeň-City District in the Plzeň Region of the Czech Republic. It has about 1,800 inhabitants.

Administrative parts
The village of Nová Huť is an administrative part of Dýšina.

Transport
The municipality is located on a train line leading from Ejpovice to Radnice. There is a train station which is served by regional trains.

Notable people
Peter Grünberg (1939–2018), German physicist, Nobel Prize laureate
Václav Riedlbauch (1947–2017), composer and politician

References

Villages in Plzeň-City District